The following lists events that have happened in 1930 in Iran.

Incumbents
 Shah: Reza Shah 
 Prime Minister: Mehdi Qoli Hedayat

Events
 May 7 – The 7.1  Salmas earthquake shakes northwestern Iran and southeastern Turkey with a maximum Mercalli intensity of IX (Violent). Up to 3000 people were killed.

Births
 4 July – Iraj Lalezari, scientist (died 2019)

Deaths
 21 February – Ahmad Shah Qajar, last king of Qajar dynasty died in Neuilly-sur-Seine, France.

References

 
1930s in Iran
Years of the 20th century in Iran
Persia
Persia